Ram Boolchand Jethmalani (14 September 1923 – 8 September 2019) was an Indian lawyer and politician. He served as India's Union minister of law and justice, as chairman of the Indian Bar Council, and as the president of the Supreme Court Bar Association. He was noted in the Indian legal fraternity for his forte in criminal law and high-profile civil cases.

Jethmalani obtained his LL.B. degree at the age of 17 and started practising law in his hometown, Shikarpur, until the partition of India. The partition led him to move to Mumbai as a refugee where he began his life and career afresh. He announced his retirement from judicial profession in 2017.

Throughout his political career, Jethmalani worked for improving the relations between India and Pakistan, owing to his experiences as a refugee post-partition. He was elected as member of the Lok Sabha twice, on Bharatiya Janata Party (BJP) tickets, from the Mumbai North West constituency. He also served as the union minister of urban development in the first Atal Bihari Vajpayee ministry, against whom he later contested election in the 2004 Indian general elections from the Lucknow constituency. He later returned to BJP in 2010, and was elected to the Rajya Sabha on its ticket.

Jethmalani was awarded the Human Rights Award by World Peace Through Law in 1977. He authored books such as Big Egos, Small Men; Conscience of a Maverick; and Maverick: Unchanged, Unrepentant; among others. He also co-authored legal scholarly books on different fields of law.

Personal life 
Jethmalani was born on 14 September 1923 in Shikarpur, Sindh in the Sindh division of the then Bombay Presidency (today a part of Pakistan) to Boolchand Gurmukhdas Jethmalani and Parbati Boolchand. He got a double promotion in school and completed matriculation at the age of 13. At the age of 17 he secured an LL.B. degree from the Bombay University with a first class distinction. At that time, the minimum age for becoming a lawyer was 21, but a special exception (resulting from an application that he made to the court contesting the rule regarding minimum age) allowed him to become a lawyer at the age of 18. He received his LL.M. from Bombay University, since Sindh did not have a university of its own at that time.

Jethmalani married his first wife, Durga, in a traditional Indian arranged marriage, around the age of 18. In 1947, just before partition, he married his second wife, Ratna Shahani, a lawyer by profession. His family includes both of his wives and four children – three by Durga (Rani, Shobha, Mahesh) and one by Ratna (Janak).
Among his two sons and two daughters, Mahesh and Rani have been supreme court lawyers while Mahesh is also a BJP leader, and Rani a social activist.

Jethmalani died on 8 September 2019 in New Delhi at his home at the age of 95. According to his son Mahesh Jethmalani, he was unwell for the last few months and died at 7:45 AM (IST), six days short of his 96th birthday.

Career

Legal career 
Ram Jethmalani started his career as a lawyer and Professor in Sindh before partition. He started his own law firm in Karachi with his friend A.K. Brohi who was senior to him by seven years. In February 1948, when riots broke out in Karachi, he fled to India on the advice of his friend Brohi and when he came to India in that day he had only INR 10 in his pocket and with that note he stayed in the refugee camp for few days.

Jethmalani fought his first case at the age of 17 in the court of Sindh under Justice Godfrey Davis, contesting the rule regarding minimum age passed by the Bar Council of Sindh. In a talk at Algebra in June 2017, Jethmalani recounted his first case fought in India as a refugee. The newly introduced Bombay Refugees Act treated refugees in an inhumane manner, against which Jethmalani filed a case in the Bombay High Court, praying for the law to be declared unconstitutional; a case he won.

Jethmalani later came to be noted for his appearance in the Nanavati case in 1959 with Yeshwant Vishnu Chandrachud, who later to become the Chief Justice of India. His defence of a string of smugglers in the late 1960s established his image as a "smuggler’s lawyer", to which he mentioned that he was only doing his duty as a lawyer.

In 1954, he became a part-time Professor at the Government Law College, Mumbai for both graduate and post graduate studies. He also taught comparative law at the Wayne State University in Detroit, Michigan. He has been the Chairman of Bar Council of India for four tenures, before as well as after the emergency. In 1996, he also became a member of the International Bar Association. He has served as the Professor Emeritus for Symbiosis International University law schools. In 2010, he was also elected as the president of the Supreme Court Bar Association.

During his career he was involved in a number of high-profile defence cases as lawyer – people involved in market scams (Harshad Mehta and Ketan Parekh), and a host of gangsters and smugglers including the British citizen Daisy Angus who was acquitted of hashish smuggling after serving five years in jail. He also defended L. K. Advani in the Hawala scam. He was in the news for taking up the defence of Manu Sharma, prime accused in the Jessica Lall murder case; however, he failed to get Manu Sharma acquitted. He was to be defending Lalit Modi, former Indian Premier League chairman and commissioner. Some of the cases Jethmalani appeared in include — the defence of Indira Gandhi's alleged assassins, challenging the medical evidence deposed of dr. t d dogra, a forensic expert of aiims, on record; defending Harshad Mehta in a stock market scam and the Narasimha Rao bribery case; defending Ketan Parekh in a stock market scam; appearing in a case involving Mumbai mafia gang leader, Haji Mastan; speaking on record against the death sentence of Afzal Guru, though he had not taken up the case; defending L K Advani in the Hawala scam; defending Manu Sharma in Jessica Lall's murder; defending Amit Shah in the Sohrabuddin encounter case; defending Amit Jogi in the Jaggi murder case; appearing for Sanjay Chandra's bail in the 2G spectrum case; appearing for Kulbhushan Parashar's bail in the navy war room leak case; defending Kanimozhi in the 2G spectrum case; appearing in Y. S. Jaganmohan Reddy's special leave petition on stay for C.B.I. probe into money laundering in his companies; appearing in Yeddyurappa's case on an illegal mining scam; defending A. G. Perarivalan, T Suthendraraja alias Santhan, and Sriharan alias Murugan, all convicted in the Rajiv Gandhi assassination case; defending Ramdev in case of allaged use of force on his followers at Ramlila grounds on 4 June 2011; defending Shiv Sena in Krishna Desai's murder; defending Asaram Bapu in the Jodhpur sexual assault case; defending Lalu Prasad Yadav in the supreme court and appearing for his bail in the fodder scam case, on 13 December 2013; appearing for Subrata Roy in the Sahara-SEBI case; appearing for AIADMK leader Jayalalithaa, convicted in a disproportionate assets case by the Karnataka High Court; and, appearing for AAP president Arvind Kejriwal, in a defamation case filed by Arun Jaitley, amongst others.

On 9 September 2017, he announced his retirement from the legal profession.

Political career 
Jethmalani's experience during the partition as a refugee led him to advocate for better relations between India and Pakistan, which he sought throughout his political career. He contested as an independent candidate from Ulhasnagar supported both by the Shiv Sena and Bharatiya Jan Sangh but he lost the elections. During the emergency period of 1975–1977, he was the chairman of the Bar Association of India. He heavily criticised then Prime Minister of India, Indira Gandhi. An arrest warrant was issued against him from Kerala which was stayed by the Bombay high court when over three hundred lawyers, led by Nani Palkhivala, appeared for him. However, the stay was nullified by the habeas corpus judgment in Additional District Magistrate of Jabalpur v. Shiv Kant Shukla. Jethmalani exiled himself in Canada carrying on his campaign against the emergency. He returned to India ten months later after the emergency was lifted. While in Canada, his candidature for the Parliament was filed from the Bombay North-West constituency. He won the election and retained the seat in 1980 general elections, but lost to Sunil Dutt in 1985. In the 1977 general elections after the emergency, he won against then serving Union law minister H. R. Gokhale from Bombay in the Lok Sabha elections, and hence started his political career as a parliamentarian. However he was not made law minister himself as Morarji Desai disapproved of his lifestyle.

He became a member of the Rajya Sabha in 1988 and the Union minister of law, justice and company affairs in 1996, in the cabinet of Atal Bihari Vajpayee. During the second tenure of Atal Bihari Vajpayee, in 1998, he was given the portfolio of Union minister of urban affairs and employment. But on 13 October 1999 he was again sworn in as the Union minister for law, justice and company affairs. He was asked to resign by the prime minister following differences with then chief justice of India Adarsh Sein Anand and Attorney General of India Soli Sorabjee. He was inducted into the cabinet on home Minister Lal Krishna Advani's insistence.

He had also announced his candidature for President of India stating: "I owe it to the nation to offer my services". He launched his own political fronts, the Bharat Mukti Morcha, as a "mass movement" in 1987. In 1995, he launched his own political party called the Pavitra Hindustan Kazhagam, with the motto to achieve "transparency in functioning of Indian democracy".

In the general elections of 2004, he contested against Atal Bihari Vajpayee from the Lucknow constituency as an independent candidate. The Indian National Congress did not field their candidates in this election; however, he lost. Later on, in 2010, he was given a Rajya Sabha ticket by Bharatiya Janta Party from Rajasthan and he was elected. He was also a member of the Committee on Personnel, Public Grievances, Law and Justice. Jethmalani has been criticised as being "opportunistic" as a result of this. Jethmalani was noted for speaking his mind; at a reception hosted by the Pakistan High Commission for the Pakistan Foreign Minister Hina Rabbani Khar who was on a visit to India on 28 July 2011, Jethmalani in the presence of the Chinese ambassador called China an enemy of both India and Pakistan and warned the Indians and Pakistanis to beware of the Chinese.

In December 2009, the Committee on Judicial Accountability stated that it considered that recommendations for judicial appointments should only be made after a public debate, including review by members of the bar of the affected high courts. This statement was made in relation to controversy about the appointments of justices C. K. Prasad and P. D. Dinakaran. The statement was signed by Jethmalani, Shanti Bhushan, Fali Sam Nariman, Anil B. Divan, Kamini Jaiswal and Prashant Bhushan.

In 2012, Jethmalani wrote to then Bhartiya Janata Party (BJP) President Nitin Gadkari, accusing opposition BJP leaders of being "silent against the huge corruption" within the ruling UPA-II government, and stated that BJP "is sick". Jethmalani's letter became public on the internet. The same year, in November, Jethmalani wrote a letter to BJP leader L.K. Advani asking for the removal of Nitin Gadkari as the president of the BJP. He cited the allegations of corruption levelled against Gadkari as the reason for his demand. He had stated "When there are serious allegations against Gadkari, he should have stayed away, if only to raise his stature in the public eye,". He publicly criticised Gadkari, even though Gadkari continued to be the BJP president. When Jethmalani was questioned if the BJP's parent body, the Rashtriya Swayamsevak Sangh (RSS), that had been supporting Gadkari, was controlling BJP, Jethmalani had replied "I am sure the RSS is trying to influence the functioning of the BJP. After all, BJP leaders have grown up with the RSS,".

In May 2013, BJP expelled Jethmalani from the party for six years, for having made anti-party statements. In October 2013, defamation charges were framed against BJP seeking  as "null and void and damages" for making a statement that he was not a fit person to be member of the party.

Awards and achievements 
 International Jurist Award
 1977 – Human Rights Award by World Peace Through Law

Books

Books by Jethmalani 
 Big Egos, Small Men
 Conflict of Laws (1955)
Conscience of a Maverick
 Justice: Soviet Style
 Maverick: Unchanged, Unrepentant

Jethmalani had also co-authored various legal scholarly books on fields of law such as criminal law, administrative law, and media law.

Books on jutise
 Ram Jethmalani : The Authorized Biography by Nalini Gera
 Rebel: A Biography of Ram Jethmalani by Susan Adelman

In popular culture
 Actor Mithilesh Chaturvedi portrays Jethmalani in Scam 1992, a Sony LIV's original web series based on 1992 Indian stock market scam of Harshad Mehta.
 Actor Sumeet Vyas portrays Ram Jethmalani in Hindi webseries The Verdict based on real life incident that is Nanavati case available on OTT platform Zee5 and in association with Ekta Kapoor's Alt Balaji.
 Actor Ram Kapoor portrays Jethmalani in the Bollywood film The Big Bull, starring Abhishek Bachchan, loosely based on the life and crimes of Harshad Mehta.
Actor Sachin Khedekar  portrays Jethmalani in the 2016 Bollywood film Rustom.

See also 
 K. M. Nanavati vs. State of Maharashtra

References

External links 
 Bio-profile of Jethmalani as Lok Sabha Member
 Rajya Sabha Member

|-

|-

|-

20th-century Indian lawyers
Law Ministers of India
People from Shikarpur District
Sindhi people
1923 births
2019 deaths
India MPs 1977–1979
India MPs 1980–1984
Rajya Sabha members from Karnataka
Nominated members of the Rajya Sabha
Bharatiya Janata Party politicians from Maharashtra
Janata Party politicians
Criminal defense lawyers
Lawyers from Karachi
Politicians from Karachi
Rajya Sabha members from Maharashtra
Rajya Sabha members from Rajasthan
Lok Sabha members from Maharashtra
Indian Senior Counsel
Rashtriya Janata Dal politicians
Rajya Sabha members from Bihar